The 2008 Latvian Athletics Championships were held in Valmiera, Latvia on July 25-26, 2008.

Men

Women

External links
Results

Valmiera
Latvian Athletics Championships
Latvian Athletics Championships, 2008
Latvian Athletics Championships